When Naples Sings (Italian: Napoli che canta) is a 1930 Italian musical film directed by Mario Almirante and starring Malcolm Tod. The film was originally made in 1928 as a silent film but delays, including the addition of sound, meant it was not released for two years. It consists almost entirely of recorded Neapolitan songs It was shot at the FERT Studios in Turin. The film enjoyed some success, and was distributed in seven South American countries. It has been described as a "poorly made musical film".

Cast
Malcolm Tod as Genny D'Ambrosio
Anna Mari as Alice Baldwin
Lilian Lyl as Carmela
Giorgio Curti as Taniello
 Carlo Tedeschi
 Nino Altieri
 Camillo De Rossi
 Elvira Marchionni
 Giovanni Marcial
 Felice Minotti
 Ellen Meis
 Adriana Facchetti

References

Bibliography
 Mancini, Elaine. Struggles of the Italian film industry during fascism, 1930-1935. UMI Research Press, 1985.

External links
 

1930 films
1930s Italian-language films
Documentary films about music and musicians
Films directed by Mario Almirante
1930 musical films
Italian musical films
Films set in Naples
Italian black-and-white films
1930s Italian films